Glyphodella vadonalis is a moth in the family Crambidae. It was described by Pierre Viette in 1958. It is found on Madagascar.

This species has a wingspan of 15–16 mm and a wing length of 7-7.5 mm. The forewings are brownish with two larger and some smaller hyaline (glass-like) spots. The hindwings brownish with two larger, connected, hyaline spots.

References

Moths described in 1958
Spilomelinae